

Peerage of England

|Duke of Cornwall (1337)||Arthur Tudor||1486||1502||
|-
|Duke of Buckingham (1444)||Edward Stafford, 3rd Duke of Buckingham||1485||1521||
|-
|rowspan="2"|Duke of Suffolk (1448)||John de la Pole, 2nd Duke of Suffolk||1450||1491||Died
|-
|Edmund de la Pole, 3rd Duke of Suffolk||1491||1493||Surrendered the Dukedom
|-
|Duke of Norfolk (1483)||none||1485||1514||Attainted
|-
|Duke of Bedford (1485)||Jasper Tudor, 1st Duke of Bedford||1485||1495||Died, title extinct
|-
|Duke of York (1494)||Henry Tudor||1494||1509||New creation
|-
|Duke of Somerset (1499)||Edmund Tudor, Duke of Somerset||1499||1500||New creation; died; title extinct
|-
|Marquess of Dorset (1475)||Thomas Grey, 1st Marquess of Dorset||1475||1501||
|-
|Marquess of Berkeley (1489)||William de Berkeley, 1st Marquess of Berkeley||1489||1492||Died, title extinct
|-
|rowspan="2"|Earl of Warwick (1088)||Anne Neville, 16th Countess of Warwick||1448||1492||Died
|-
|Edward Plantagenet, 17th Earl of Warwick||1492||1499||Attainted, and his honours became forfeited
|-
|Earl of Arundel (1138)||Thomas FitzAlan, 17th Earl of Arundel||1487||1524||
|-
|Earl of Oxford (1142)||John de Vere, 13th Earl of Oxford||1485||1513||
|-
|rowspan="2"|Earl of Westmorland (1397)||Ralph Neville, 3rd Earl of Westmorland||1484||1499||Died
|-
|Ralph Neville, 4th Earl of Westmorland||1499||1549||
|-
|Earl of Northumberland (1416)||Henry Percy, 5th Earl of Northumberland||1489||1527||
|-
|Earl of Shrewsbury (1442)||George Talbot, 4th Earl of Shrewsbury||1473||1538||
|-
|Earl of Essex (1461)||Henry Bourchier, 2nd Earl of Essex||1483||1540||
|-
|rowspan="2"|Earl of Kent (1465)||Edmund Grey, 1st Earl of Kent||1465||1490||Died
|-
|George Grey, 2nd Earl of Kent||1490||1505||
|-
|Earl Rivers (1465)||Richard Woodville, 3rd Earl Rivers||1483||1491||Died, title extinct
|-
|Earl of Wiltshire (1470)||Edward Stafford, 2nd Earl of Wiltshire||1473||1499||Died, title extinct
|-
|rowspan="2"|Earl of Winchester (1472)||Lewis de Bruges, 1st Earl of Winchester||1472||1492||Died
|-
|John de Bruges, 2nd Earl of Winchester||1492||1500||Resigned the Peerage
|-
|Earl of Huntingdon (1479)||William Herbert, 1st Earl of Huntingdon||1479||1491||Died, title extinct
|-
|Earl of Surrey (1483)||Thomas Howard, 1st Earl of Surrey||1483||1524||
|-
|Earl of Devon (1485)||Edward Courtenay, 1st Earl of Devon||1485||1509||
|-
|Earl of Derby (1485)||Thomas Stanley, 1st Earl of Derby||1485||1504||
|-
|Viscount Beaumont (1440)||William Beaumont, 2nd Viscount Beaumont||1460||1507||
|-
|rowspan="2"|Viscount Lisle (1483)||Edward Grey, 1st Viscount Lisle||1483||1492||Died
|-
|John Grey, 2nd Viscount Lisle||1492||1504||
|-
|Viscount Welles (1487)||John Welles, Viscount Welles||1487||1499||Died, title extinct
|-
|Baron de Ros (1264)||Edmund de Ros, 10th Baron de Ros||1464||1508||
|-
|Baron Dynham (1295)||John Dynham, 8th or 1st Baron Dynham||1467||1501||
|- 
|Baron Fauconberg (1295)||Joan Neville, 6th Baroness Fauconberg||1429||1490||Died, Barony fell into abeyance until 1903
|- 
|Baron FitzWalter (1295)||John Radcliffe, 9th Baron FitzWalter||1485||1496||Attainted, and his honours became forfeited
|- 
|Baron FitzWarine (1295)||John Bourchier, 11th Baron FitzWarin||1479||1539||
|- 
|rowspan="3"|Baron Grey de Wilton (1295)||Reginald Grey, 7th Baron Grey de Wilton||1442||1493||Died
|-
|John Grey, 8th Baron Grey de Wilton||1493||1498||
|-
|Edmund Grey, 9th Baron Grey de Wilton||1498||1511||
|-
|Baron Clinton (1299)||John Clinton, 7th Baron Clinton||1488||1514||
|- 
|Baron De La Warr (1299)||Thomas West, 8th Baron De La Warr||1476||1525||
|- 
|Baron Ferrers of Chartley (1299)||John Devereux, 9th Baron Ferrers of Chartley||1468||1501||
|- 
|Baron de Clifford (1299)||Henry Clifford, 10th Baron de Clifford||1485||1523||
|- 
|Baron Morley (1299)||Alice Parker, 9th Baroness Morley||1489||1518||
|- 
|Baron Strange of Knockyn (1299)||Joan le Strange, 9th Baroness Strange||1470||1514||
|- 
|Baron Zouche of Haryngworth (1308)||John la Zouche, 7th Baron Zouche||1468||1526||Attainder reversed in 1495
|- 
|rowspan="2"|Baron Audley of Heleigh (1313)||John Tuchet, 6th Baron Audley||1459||1490||Died
|- 
|James Tuchet, 7th Baron Audley||1490||1497||Died, title became forfeited
|- 
|Baron Cobham of Kent (1313)||John Brooke, 7th Baron Cobham||1464||1512||
|- 
|rowspan="2"|Baron Willoughby de Eresby (1313)||Christopher Willoughby, 10th Baron Willoughby de Eresby||1475||1499||Died
|- 
|William Willoughby, 11th Baron Willoughby de Eresby||1499||1526||
|- 
|Baron Dacre (1321)||Thomas Fiennes, 8th Baron Dacre||1486||1534||
|- 
|Baron FitzHugh (1321)||George FitzHugh, 7th Baron FitzHugh||1487||1513||
|- 
|Baron Greystock (1321)||Elizabeth Dacre, 6th Baroness Greystoke||1487||1516||
|- 
|Baron Harington (1326)||Cecily Bonville, 7th Baroness Harington||1460||1530||
|- 
|rowspan="2"|Baron Scrope of Masham (1350)||Thomas Scrope, 6th Baron Scrope of Masham||1475||1493||Died
|- 
|Alice Scrope, 7th Baroness Scrope of Masham||1493||1502||
|- 
|Baron Botreaux (1368)||Mary Hungerford, 5th Baroness Botreaux||1477||1529||
|- 
|rowspan="2"|Baron Scrope of Bolton (1371)||John Scrope, 5th Baron Scrope of Bolton||1459||1498||Died
|- 
|Henry Scrope, 6th Baron Scrope of Bolton||1498||1506||
|- 
|Baron Cromwell (1375)||Maud Stanhope, 4th Baroness Cromwell||1490||1497||Abeyance terminated in 1490; Died, Barony fell into abeyance again, until terminated in 1923
|- 
|Baron Lumley (1384)||George Lumley, 3rd Baron Lumley||1480||1508||
|- 
|rowspan="2"|Baron Bergavenny (1392)||George Nevill, 4th Baron Bergavenny||1447||1492||Died
|- 
|George Nevill, 5th Baron Bergavenny||1492||1536||
|- 
|Baron Grey of Codnor (1397)||Henry Grey, 4th Baron Grey of Codnor||1444||1496||Died, Barony fell into abeyance until 1989
|- 
|Baron Berkeley (1421)||Maurice Berkeley, 3rd Baron Berkeley||1492||1506||Title previously held by the Marquess of Berkeley
|- 
|Baron Latimer (1432)||Richard Neville, 2nd Baron Latimer||1469||1530||
|- 
|Baron Dudley (1440)||Edward Sutton, 2nd Baron Dudley||1487||1532||
|- 
|Baron Lisle (1444)||John Grey, 4th Baron Lisle||1487||1504||
|- 
|Baron Saye and Sele (1447)||Richard Fiennes, 4th Baron Saye and Sele||1476||1501||
|- 
|Baron Beauchamp of Powick (1447)||Richard Beauchamp, 2nd Baron Beauchamp||1475||1503||
|- 
|Baron Stourton (1448)||William Stourton, 5th Baron Stourton||1487||1523||
|- 
|Baron Berners (1455)||John Bourchier, 2nd Baron Berners||1474||1533||
|- 
|Baron Hastings de Hastings (1461)||Edward Hastings, 2nd Baron Hastings||1483||1506||
|- 
|Baron Herbert (1461)||Elizabeth Somerset, Baroness Herbert||1490||1514||Title previously held by the Earls of Pembroke
|- 
|Baron Ogle (1461)||Ralph Ogle, 3rd Baron Ogle||1485||1513||
|- 
|Baron Mountjoy (1465)||William Blount, 4th Baron Mountjoy||1485||1534||
|- 
|Baron Dacre of Gilsland (1473)||Thomas Dacre, 2nd Baron Dacre||1485||1525||
|- 
|rowspan="2"|Baron Grey of Powis (1482)||John Grey, 1st Baron Grey of Powis||1482||1497||Died
|- 
|John Grey, 2nd Baron Grey of Powis||1497||1504||
|- 
|Baron Daubeney (1486)||Giles Daubeney, 1st Baron Daubeney||1486||1507||
|- 
|Baron Cheyne (1487)||John Cheyne, Baron Cheyne||1487||1499||Died, title extinct
|- 
|Baron Willoughby de Broke (1491)||Robert Willoughby, 1st Baron Willoughby de Broke||1492||1502||New creation
|- 
|Baron Ormond of Rochford (1495)||Thomas Butler, 1st Baron Ormond of Rochford||1495||1515||New creation; also Earl of Ormond in the Peerage of Ireland
|- 
|}

Peerage of Scotland

|Duke of Rothesay (1398)||-||1488||1507||
|-
|Duke of Ross (1488)||James Stewart, Duke of Ross||1488||1504||
|-
|Duke of Montrose (1489)||David Lindsay, 1st Duke of Montrose||1489||1495||Died, title extinct
|-
|Earl of Sutherland (1235)||John de Moravia, 8th Earl of Sutherland||1460||1508||
|-
|Earl of Angus (1389)||Archibald Douglas, 5th Earl of Angus||1463||1513||
|-
|Earl of Crawford (1398)||John Lindsay, 6th Earl of Crawford||1495||1513||Title previously held by the Duke of Montrose
|-
|rowspan=2|Earl of Menteith (1427)||Malise Graham, 1st Earl of Menteith||1427||1490||Died
|-
|Alexander Graham, 2nd Earl of Menteith||1490||1537||
|-
|Earl of Huntly (1445)||George Gordon, 2nd Earl of Huntly||1470||1501||
|-
|Earl of Erroll (1452)||William Hay, 3rd Earl of Erroll||1470||1507||
|-
|Earl of Caithness (1455)||William Sinclair, 2nd Earl of Caithness||1476||1513||
|-
|rowspan=2|Earl of Argyll (1457)||Colin Campbell, 1st Earl of Argyll||1457||1493||Died
|-
|Archibald Campbell, 2nd Earl of Argyll||1493||1513||New creation
|-
|Earl of Atholl (1457)||John Stewart, 1st Earl of Atholl||1457||1512||
|-
|rowspan=2|Earl of Morton (1458)||James Douglas, 1st Earl of Morton||1458||1493||Died
|-
|John Douglas, 2nd Earl of Morton||1493||1513||
|-
|rowspan=2|Earl of Rothes (1458)||George Leslie, 1st Earl of Rothes||1458||1490||Died
|-
|George Leslie, 2nd Earl of Rothes||1490||1513||
|-
|Earl Marischal (1458)||William Keith, 3rd Earl Marischal||1483||1530||
|-
|rowspan=2|Earl of Buchan (1469)||James Stewart, 1st Earl of Buchan||1469||1499||Died
|-
|Alexander Stewart, 2nd Earl of Buchan||1469||1505||
|-
|Earl of Mar and Garioch (1486)||John Stewart, Earl of Mar and Garioch||1485||1503||
|-
|rowspan=2|Earl of Glencairn (1488)||Robert Cunningham, 2nd Earl of Glencairn||1488||1490||De jure Earl; died
|-
|Cuthbert Cunningham, 3rd Earl of Glencairn||1490||1541||De jure Earl, until 1503
|-
|Earl of Bothwell (1488)||Patrick Hepburn, 1st Earl of Bothwell||1488||1508||
|-
|rowspan=2|Earl of Lennox (1488)||John Stewart, 1st Earl of Lennox||1488||1495||Died
|-
|Matthew Stewart, 2nd Earl of Lennox||1495||1513||
|-
|rowspan=2|Lord Erskine (1429)||Thomas Erskine, 2nd Lord Erskine||1453||1494||de jure Earl of Mar; died
|-
|Alexander Erskine, 3rd Lord Erskine||1494||1509||de jure Earl of Mar
|-
|rowspan=2|Lord Somerville (1430)||John Somerville, 3rd Lord Somerville||1456||1491||Died
|-
|John Somerville, 4th Lord Somerville||1491||1523||
|-
|rowspan=2|Lord Haliburton of Dirleton (1441)||George Haliburton, 4th Lord Haliburton of Dirleton||1459||1492||Died
|-
|James Haliburton, 5th Lord Haliburton of Dirleton||1492||1502||
|-
|rowspan=3|Lord Forbes (1442)||Alexander Forbes, 4th Lord Forbes||1483||1491||Died
|-
|Arthur Forbes, 5th Lord Forbes||1491||1493||
|-
|John Forbes, 6th Lord Forbes||1493||1547||
|-
|Lord Hamilton (1445)||James Hamilton, 2nd Lord Hamilton||1479||1529||
|-
|Lord Maxwell (1445)||John Maxwell, 3rd Lord Maxwell||1485||1513||
|-
|rowspan=2|Lord Glamis (1445)||John Lyon, 3rd Lord Glamis||1486||1497||Died
|-
|John Lyon, 4th Lord Glamis||1497||1500||
|-
|Lord Graham (1445)||William Graham, 3rd Lord Graham||1472||1513||
|-
|rowspan=3|Lord Lindsay of the Byres (1445)||David Lindsay, 2nd Lord Lindsay||1482||1490||Died
|-
|John Lindsay, 3rd Lord Lindsay||1490||1497||Died
|-
|Patrick Lindsay, 4th Lord Lindsay||1497||1526||
|-
|Lord Saltoun (1445)||James Abernethy, 3rd Lord Saltoun||1488||1505||
|-
|Lord Gray (1445)||Andrew Gray, 2nd Lord Gray||1469||1514||
|-
|Lord Montgomerie (1449)||Hugh Montgomerie, 2nd Lord Montgomerie||1470||1545||
|-
|Lord Sinclair (1449)||Henry Sinclair, 3rd Lord Sinclair||1487||1513||
|-
|rowspan=2|Lord Fleming (1451)||Robert Fleming, 1st Lord Fleming||1451||1494||Died
|-
|John Fleming, 2nd Lord Fleming||1494||1524||
|-
|Lord Seton (1451)||George Seton, 2nd Lord Seton||1478||1508||
|-
|Lord Borthwick (1452)||William Borthwick, 3rd Lord Borthwick||1484||1503||
|-
|Lord Boyd (1454)||Alexander Boyd, 3rd Lord Boyd||1482||Aft. 1508||
|-
|rowspan=2|Lord Oliphant (1455)||Laurence Oliphant, 1st Lord Oliphant||1455||1498||Died
|-
|John Oliphant, 2nd Lord Oliphant||1498||1516||
|-
|Lord Kennedy (1457)||John Kennedy, 2nd Lord Kennedy||1489||1509||
|-
|rowspan=2|Lord Livingston (1458)||James Livingston, 2nd Lord Livingston||1467||1497||Died
|-
|James Livingston, 3rd Lord Livingston||1497||1503||
|-
|rowspan=2|Lord Cathcart (1460)||Alan Cathcart, 1st Lord Cathcart||1460||1497||Died
|-
|John Cathcart, 2nd Lord Cathcart||1497||1535||
|-
|Lord Lovat (1464)||Hugh Fraser, 1st Lord Lovat||1464||1500||
|-
|Lord Innermeath (1470)||Thomas Stewart, 2nd Lord Innermeath||1489||1513||
|-
|Lord Carlyle of Torthorwald (1473)||John Carlyle, 1st Lord Carlyle||1473||1501||
|-
|rowspan=2|Lord Home (1473)||Alexander Home, 1st Lord Home||1473||1490||Died
|-
|Alexander Home, 2nd Lord Home||1490||1506||
|-
|Lord of the Isles (1476)||John of Islay, 1st Lord of the Isles||1476||1498||Died; title forfeit
|-
|Lord Ruthven (1488)||William Ruthven, 1st Lord Ruthven||1488||1528||
|-
|rowspan=2|Lord Crichton of Sanquhar (1488)||Robert Crichton, 1st Lord Crichton of Sanquhar||1488||1494||Died
|-
|Robert Crichton, 2nd Lord Crichton of Sanquhar||1494||1513||
|-
|Lord Drummond of Cargill (1488)||John Drummond, 1st Lord Drummond||1488||1519||
|-
|Lord Hay of Yester (1488)||John Hay, 1st Lord Hay of Yester||1488||1508||
|-
|Lord Sempill (1489)||John Sempill, 1st Lord Sempill||1489||1513||
|-
|Lord Herries of Terregles (1490)||Herbert Herries, 1st Lord Herries of Terregles||1490||1505||New creation
|-
|Lord Ogilvy of Airlie (1491)||James Ogilvy, 1st Lord Ogilvy of Airlie||1491||1504||New creation
|-
|Lord Ross (1499)||John Ross, 1st Lord Ross||1499||1501||New creation
|-
|}

Peerage of Ireland

|Earl of Kildare (1316)||Gerald FitzGerald, 8th Earl of Kildare||1478||1513||
|-
|Earl of Ormond (1328)||Thomas Butler, 7th Earl of Ormond||1478||1515||
|-
|Earl of Desmond (1329)||Maurice FitzGerald, 9th Earl of Desmond||1487||1520||
|-
|Earl of Waterford (1446)||George Talbot, 4th Earl of Waterford||1473||1538||
|-
|Viscount Gormanston (1478)||Robert Preston, 1st Viscount Gormanston||1478||1503||
|-
|Baron Athenry (1172)||Thomas III de Bermingham||1473||1500||
|-
|rowspan=2|Baron Kingsale (1223)||James de Courcy, 13th Baron Kingsale||1476||1499||Died
|-
|Edmond de Courcy, 14th Baron Kingsale||1499||1505||
|-
|rowspan=2|Baron Kerry (1223)||Edmond Fitzmaurice, 9th Baron Kerry||1469||1498||Died
|-
|Edmond Fitzmaurice, 10th Baron Kerry||1498||1543||
|-
|Baron Barry (1261)||William Barry, 11th Baron Barry||1488||1500||
|-
|rowspan=2|Baron Slane (1370)||James Fleming, 7th Baron Slane||1470||1492||Died
|-
|Christopher Fleming, 8th Baron Slane||1492||1517||
|-
|Baron Howth (1425)||Nicholas St Lawrence, 4th Baron Howth||1485||1526||
|-
|Baron Killeen (1449)||Edmond Plunkett, 4th Baron Killeen||1469||1510||
|-
|Baron Trimlestown (1461)||Christopher Barnewall, 2nd Baron Trimlestown||1470||1513||
|-
|Baron Dunsany (1462)||John Plunkett, 3rd Baron of Dunsany||1480||1500||
|-
|Baron Portlester (1462)||Rowland FitzEustace, 1st Baron Portlester||1462||1496||Died, title extinct
|-
|Baron Delvin (1486)||Richard Nugent, 1st Baron Delvin||1486||1537||
|-
|}

References

 

Lists of peers by decade
1490s in England
1490s in Ireland
15th century in England
15th century in Scotland
15th century in Ireland
15th-century English nobility
15th-century Scottish peers
15th-century Irish people
Peers